James Anthony Lawson, PC (Ire), QC (1817–1887) was an Irish academic, lawyer and judge.

Background and education
Lawson was born in Waterford. He was the eldest son of James Lawson and Mary Anthony, daughter of Joseph Anthony, and was educated at the endowed school there. Having entered Trinity College Dublin, he was elected a scholar in 1836, obtained a senior moderatorship in 1837 and earned a gold medallist and first-class honours in ethics and logic. He graduated with a BA in 1838, an LLB in 1841 and LLD in 1850. He served as Whately professor of political economy from 1840 to 1845.

Legal and judicial career
Lawson was called to the Irish Bar in 1840 and soon obtained a good practice, especially in the courts of equity. On 29 January 1857, he was gazetted a Queen's Counsel, elected bencher of King's Inns, Dublin, 1861, and acted as Law Adviser to the Lord Lieutenant of Ireland from 1858 to 1859. He was appointed Solicitor-General for Ireland in February 1861 and in 1865 Attorney-General for Ireland, when he was sworn a member of the Irish privy council.

As attorney-general he had in to grapple with the Fenian conspiracy of 1865, when he suppressed the Irish People newspaper, and the leaders of that movement were arrested and prosecuted. On 4 April 1857, he had unsuccessfully contested the seat for Dublin University, but on 15 July 1865 won the seat of Portarlington for the Liberals. However, he was defeated in the general election of December 1868. He was appointed fourth justice of the Court of Common Pleas, Ireland, in December 1868 and held the post till June 1882, when he was transferred to the Queen's Bench division.

During the Land League agitation he presided over several important political trials. An attempt was made to murder him while walking in Kildare Street, Dublin, on 11 November 1882, by Patrick Delaney, who was afterwards tried for the Phoenix Park murders and became a Crown  informer. Lawson was made one of the Irish Church Commissioners in July 1869, gazetted a privy councillor in England on 18 May 1870, acted as a commissioner for the Great Seal of Ireland from March to December 1874, was a vice-president of the Dublin Statistical Society and became a DCL of Oxford in 1884.

Personal life
Lawson died at Shankill, near Dublin, on 10 August 1887. In 1842, he married Jane Merrick, eldest daughter of Samuel Merrick of Cork, with whom he had a son, James. In the 1860s he built a Victorian gothic mansion by the sea in Shankill called Clontra, which was designed by Deane & Woodward.

Publications
 ‘Five Lectures on Political Economy,’ 1844.
 ‘Duties and Obligations involved in Mercantile Relations. A lecture,’ 1855.
 ‘Speech at the Election for Members to serve in Parliament for the University of Dublin,’ 1857. With H. Connor he compiled
 ‘Reports of Cases in High Court of Chancery of Ireland during the time of Lord Chancellor Sugden,’ 1865.
 'Hymni Usitati Latine Redditi, with Other Verses'. Kegan Paul,Trench & Co. 1883.
 'A Century of Irish Government' [Manuscript life of Sir Thomas Larcom, Bart], Edinburgh Review, no. 336, 1886.

Arms

References

External links
 

1817 births
1887 deaths
Alumni of Trinity College Dublin
Attorneys-General for Ireland
Irish Queen's Counsel
Judges of the High Court of Justice in Ireland
Members of the Parliament of the United Kingdom for Portarlington
Members of the Privy Council of Great Britain
Members of the Privy Council of Ireland
Members of the Privy Council of the United Kingdom
People from Waterford (city)
Scholars of Trinity College Dublin
Serjeants-at-law (Ireland)
Solicitors-General for Ireland
Statistical and Social Inquiry Society of Ireland
UK MPs 1865–1868